The plantations of Leon County were numerous and vast. Leon County, in the U.S. state of Florida, was a true cotton kingdom. From the 1820s through 1850s Leon County attracted cotton planters from Georgia, Virginia, Maryland, North and South Carolina, plus other states and abroad to its fertile red clay soils and long growing season.

Slaves in Leon County
For some time and up until the early stages of the Civil War, Leon County was the fifth-largest producer of cotton among all counties in Georgia and Florida. (C. Paisley). Another source states that Leon County led the state in cotton production. Because of this, in 1840, there were 654 adult white males, but 3980 "engaged in agriculture". In 1860, 73% of the population of Leon County consisted of enslaved black persons; as was true elsewhere in the South, the value of those enslaved persons far exceeded the value of all the land in the county. Leon County had more people enslaved than any other county in Florida, and it was, therefore, the wealthiest county in Florida. It was also the center of Florida's slave trade.

Plantations in 1860
Note: Value = plantation value in United States dollars. TA = total area. IA = improved area. UA = unimproved area. Corn = in bushels. Cotton = bales of cotton

Note: Value = Plantation Value. IA = Improved Acres. UA = Unimproved Acres. Enslaved People = Number of persons enslaved. Machinery = Worth of machinery. Livestock = Worth of livestock.

See also 

 List of plantations in the United States
 Slavery in the United States

References

Further reading

History of Leon County, Florida
African-American history of Florida